Inga Broberg (later Stenbrink, born 5 November 1939) is a retired Swedish athlete. She won national titles in the long jump (1958 and 1959) and 4 × 100 m relay (1957) and placed eights in the long jump at the 1958 European Championships.

References

Swedish female sprinters
Swedish female long jumpers
1939 births
Living people
20th-century Swedish women